Scott Daly (born February 7, 1994) is an American football long snapper for the Detroit Lions of the National Football League (NFL). He played college football at Notre Dame.

Early years
Daly began long-snapping in the fifth grade. He attended Downers Grove South High School. He played tight end and also handled the team's long-snapping duties. As a junior, he received All-conference and honorable-mention All-area honors at tight end. 

As a senior, he scored his first career touchdown in the season opener. He was named the national high school long snapper of the year and was ranked the number one long snapper in the nation by Scout.com. In April 2011, he committed to the University of Notre Dame.

College career
Daly accepted a football scholarship from the University of Notre Dame. As a freshman in 2012, he did not see any action behind Jordan Cowart.

As a sophomore in 2013, he was named the team's long snapper for all 13 games. He posted 2 special teams tackles. As a junior in 2014, he was perfect on 127 snapping opportunities. 

As a senior in 2015, he started all 13 games, accumulating 39 straight over his first three seasons. He was perfect on 126 snapping opportunities and contributed to Justin Yoon freshman All-American season. On October 31 against Temple University, he posted his first special teams tackle since 2013. On November 21, he recovered a fumble on a muffed punt at the 4-yard line in a game against Boston College. He also was recognized for his work in sending supplies to the Dominican Republic. He played a total of 39 games during his college career.

Professional career

Chicago Bears
Daly was not selected in the 2017 NFL Draft. He instead received an invitation for a rookie minicamp tryout with the Chicago Bears in May. The Bears decided against signing him to a contract and Daly spent the 2017 season out of football.

Dallas Cowboys
On April 16, 2018, Daly signed as a free agent with the Dallas Cowboys. On September 1, he was waived, after not being able to pass stalwart starter L.P. Ladouceur on the depth chart.

San Antonio Commanders
On October 26, 2018, Daly signed with the San Antonio Commanders of the AAF. He played with the team until the league ceased operations in April 2019.

New York Guardians
In October 2019, Daly was drafted by the New York Guardians in the open phase of the 2020 XFL Draft. He had his contract terminated when the league suspended operations on April 10, 2020.

Detroit Lions
On May 4, 2021, Daly signed as a free agent with the Detroit Lions. He earned the long snapper job during the preseason after passing 17-year veteran Don Muhlbach on the depth chart.

References

External links
Notre Dame Fighting Irish bio

1994 births
Living people
American football long snappers
Dallas Cowboys players
Detroit Lions players
San Antonio Commanders players
Sportspeople from DuPage County, Illinois
Notre Dame Fighting Irish football players
New York Guardians players
People from Downers Grove, Illinois
Players of American football from Illinois